Anders Petersen may refer to:

Anders Petersen (photographer) (born 1944), Swedish photographer
Anders Petersen (boxer) (1902–1966), Danish boxer who competed in the 1920s
Anders Petersen (sport shooter) (1876–1968), Danish sport shooter Olympic champion
Anders Petersen (historian) (1827–1914), Danish teacher and historian
Anders H Petersen, Greenlandic footballer who played for B-67 and the Greenland national football team in the 2006 ELF Cup

See also
Anders Peterson (born 1965), Swedish swimmer